Happiness Comes at Nine o'Clock (Sreća dolazi u 9) is a Croatian fantasy film directed by Nikola Tanhofer. It was released in 1961. It was preserved and, in 2003, restored by the Croatian State Archives. It is based on the fairy tale The Galoshes of Fortune by Hans Christian Andersen, and was the first feature-length fantasy film in Yugoslav cinematography, and the last role of Mila Dimitrijević. It was released in SFR Yugoslavia, Italy, Bulgaria and Egypt.

Plot summary 

Two women, Happiness and Worry, arrive to a small town. Happiness leaves a magic coat at the local restaurant, stating that anyone who wears it will have all their wishes fulfilled. The magic coat goes on to fulfill the wishes of a shy violin teacher; an old night watchman; Miki, a student; and a young blonde woman – all to little satisfaction.

References

External links 
 

1961 films
Croatian fantasy films
1960s Croatian-language films
Yugoslav fantasy films
Films based on works by Hans Christian Andersen
Films directed by Nikola Tanhofer
Jadran Film films
Films based on fairy tales